Dracy-lès-Couches (literally Dracy near Couches) is a commune in the Saône-et-Loire department in the region of Bourgogne-Franche-Comté in eastern France.

Situated in rolling hills covered by vineyards and pastures, the village is home to an impressive chateau. In 2009, the village remodeled the marie and library. To allow for better access, the entrance to the building was moved from the rear to the side facing the parking lot. As of October 2009, the only store was a boulangerie.

See also
Communes of the Saône-et-Loire department

References

Communes of Saône-et-Loire